Dilhara Polgampola (born 11 October 1999) is a Sri Lankan cricketer. He made his Twenty20 debut on 6 January 2020, for Sri Lanka Ports Authority Cricket Club in the 2019–20 SLC Twenty20 Tournament. He made his List A debut on 3 April 2021, for Ace Capital Cricket Club in the 2020–21 Major Clubs Limited Over Tournament.

References

External links
 

1999 births
Living people
Sri Lankan cricketers
Sri Lanka Ports Authority Cricket Club cricketers
Place of birth missing (living people)